Oraz Nazarov (born 3 February 1970) is a retired Tajikistani footballer who played as a midfielder for the Tajikistan national football team.

Career statistics

International

Statistics accurate as of 15 February 2017

International goals

Honours
Pamir Dushanbe
Tajikistan Higher League (1): 1992
Tajikistan Cup (1): 1992
Varzob Dushanbe
Tajikistan Higher League (2): 1999, 2000
Tajikistan Cup (1): 1999

References

External links

1970 births
Living people
Soviet footballers
Tajikistani footballers
Tajikistan international footballers
Association football midfielders
Tajikistan Higher League players
FC Spartak Semey players
Soviet Top League players